Ditto is a ghost town in Atascosa County, in the U.S. state of Texas. It is located within the San Antonio metropolitan area.

History
Ditto was first settled in the late 1700s and was part of the San Jose Mission Ranch. It first went by the name of Agua Negra for the dark water in a hot spring containing iron oxide. The first post office it developed was called Mottomosa, which is Spanish for “beautiful grove”, but it was discontinued in 1875. A new post office was applied for in 1881 but with a little technical difficulty: the postmaster wrote out the word "ditto" for the name, thinking that authorities would understand that he wanted it to have the same name as before, but it was misinterpreted, and the name Ditto stuck. The community had a population of 50 in 1884 and its businesses consisted of a steam gristmill and gin and a church. There was a petition in 1885 for Ditto to be the county seat instead of Pleasanton, but it did not pass because women were not allowed to sign the petition. The population decreased to 20 in the 1890s, but the number of businesses increased; there were two gins and a general store. The population remained at 20 in 1896, which was the last year population estimates were available. A few scattered houses remained in Ditto from the 1940s to the 1960s and did not appear on maps after that.

Geography

Education
In 1904, Ditto had two schools, one with 78 White students and two teachers and the other with 33 black students and one teacher. A decade later, they had 55 white students and 17 black students enrolled. Both were named Agua Negra. There were 34 students and two teachers in only one school building in 1934. By the end of the decade, students in Ditto went to school in Poteet. It continues to be served by the Poteet Independent School District to this day.

References

Ghost towns in Texas